"Patriots of Micronesia", also known as "Across all Micronesia", is the national anthem of the Federated States of Micronesia.

History
A bill to make "Patriots of Micronesia" the national anthem was introduced in 1987, and the anthem was adopted in 1991, replacing "Preamble", the state anthem in use since independence in 1979. The melody is that of the German student song "Ich hab' mich ergeben" with lyrics by Hans Ferdinand Massmann (also known as "Wir hatten gebauet ein stattliches Haus" with lyrics by August Daniel von Binzer), which was also one of the unofficial national anthems of West Germany between 1949 and 1952. The lyrics are also loosely based on a translation of "".

Lyrics

Notes

References

External links 
<div class="plainlinks">
Patriots of Micronesia (instrumental, mp3)
Patriots of Micronesia (audio, links, lyrics and other information) (archive link)
Listen to the Micronesia Anthem(ASF FILE)

National anthems
Federated States of Micronesia music
National symbols of the Federated States of Micronesia
Oceanian anthems
1991 songs
Federated States of Micronesia songs
National anthem compositions in F major